2442 Corbett, provisional designation , is a vestoid asteroid from the inner regions of the asteroid belt, approximately 8.5 kilometers in diameter. It was discovered on 3 October 1980, by Czech astronomer Zdeňka Vávrová at Kleť Observatory, now in the Czech Republic. It is named after British-Indian hunter Jim Corbett.

Orbit and classification 

Corbett is a V-type asteroid that orbits the Sun in the inner main-belt at a distance of 2.1–2.7 AU once every 3 years and 8 months (1,348 days). Its orbit has an eccentricity of 0.12 and an inclination of 5° with respect to the ecliptic.

Rotation period 

A rotational lightcurve of Corbett was obtained from photometric observations by French amateur astronomer René Roy in July 2009. Lightcurve analysis gave a rotation period of 10 hours with a brightness amplitude of 0.12 magnitude.

Photometric observations in the R-band at the Palomar Transient Factory in 2010 and 2013, gave a divergent period of 11.453 and 49.507 hours with an amplitude of 0.19 and 0.10 magnitude, respectively.

Diameter and albedo 

According to the survey carried out by NASA's Wide-field Infrared Survey Explorer with its subsequent NEOWISE mission, Corbett measures 8.327 kilometers in diameter and its surface has an albedo of 0.255, while the Collaborative Asteroid Lightcurve Link assumes a standard albedo of stony asteroids of 0.20 and calculates a diameter of 8.57 kilometers with an absolute magnitude of 12.7.

Naming 

This minor planet was named in memory of British-Indian Jim Corbett (1875–1955), born in Nainital, India. Corbett was a colonel in the British Indian Army and a hunter of man-eating tigers and leopards in India, who became a nature conservationist, naturalist and author. He is known for his 1944 hunting biography Man-Eaters of Kumaon. The approved naming citation was published by the Minor Planet Center on 8 February 1982.

References

External links 
 Asteroid Lightcurve Database (LCDB), query form (info )
 Dictionary of Minor Planet Names, Google books
 Asteroids and comets rotation curves, CdR – Observatoire de Genève, Raoul Behrend
 Discovery Circumstances: Numbered Minor Planets (1)-(5000) – Minor Planet Center
 
 

002442
Discoveries by Zdeňka Vávrová
Named minor planets
002442
19801003